Anthology: 1983–2008 is a compilation album of David Knopfler. It was released on 10 March 2009. The compilation consists of 16 tracks from his 10 solo albums.

Track listing 
"Soul Kissing"
"Double Dealing"
"When We Kiss"
"What Then Must We Do"
"To Feel That Way Again"
"Lonely Is the Night"
"Rise Again"
"Southside Tenements"
"The Heart of It All"
"I Remember It All"
"Arcadie"
"St. Swithun's Day"
"Going Down with the Waves"
"Easy Street"
"Steel Wheels"
"Ship of Dreams"

Personnel 
David Knopfler - vocals, guitar, mandolin, piano, vibraphone
Chris Rea - slide guitar
Alan Clark - piano, Hammond B-3 organ
Tony Carey - piano, Hammond bB3 organ, bass guitar
Geoff Dugmore - drums, percussion
Rob Farrer - timpani
Kuma Harada - bass instrument
Harry Bogdanovs - guitar, electric guitar, banjo, mandolin, bass instrument
Megan Slankard - vocals
Peter Shaw - fretless bass
Tom McFarland - percussion

References

2009 compilation albums
David Knopfler albums